The Buran programme ("Snowstorm", "Blizzard"), also known as the "VKK Space Orbiter programme", was a Soviet and later Russian reusable spacecraft project that began in 1974 at the Central Aerohydrodynamic Institute in Moscow and was formally suspended in 1993. In addition to being the designation for the whole Soviet/Russian reusable spacecraft project, Buran was also the name given to Orbiter 1K, which completed one uncrewed spaceflight in 1988 and was the only Soviet reusable spacecraft to be launched into space. The Buran-class orbiters used the expendable Energia rocket as a launch vehicle. 

The Buran programme was started by the Soviet Union as a response to the United States Space Shuttle program and benefited from extensive espionage undertaken by the KGB of the unclassified US Space Shuttle programme, resulting in many superficial and functional similarities between American and Soviet Shuttle designs. Although the Buran class was similar in appearance to NASA's Space Shuttle orbiter, and could similarly operate as a re-entry spaceplane, its final internal and functional design was different. For example, the main engines during launch were on the Energia rocket and were not taken into orbit by the spacecraft. Smaller rocket engines on the craft's body provided propulsion in orbit and de-orbital burns, similar to the Space Shuttle's OMS pods. Unlike the Space Shuttle, Buran had a capability of flying uncrewed missions, as well as performing fully automated landings. The project was the largest and the most expensive in the history of Soviet space exploration.

Background 
The Soviet reusable spacecraft programme has its roots in the late 1950s, at the very beginning of the space age. The idea of Soviet reusable space flight is very old, though it was neither continuous nor consistently organized. Before Buran, no project of the programme reached operational status.

The first step toward a reusable Soviet spacecraft was the 1954 Burya, a high-altitude prototype jet aircraft/cruise missile. Several test flights were made before it was cancelled by order of the Central Committee. The Burya had the goal of delivering a nuclear payload, presumably to the United States, and then returning to base. The Burya programme was cancelled by the USSR in favor of a decision to develop ICBMs instead. The next iteration of a reusable spacecraft was the Zvezda design, which also reached a prototype stage. Decades later, the another project with the same name would be used as a service module for the International Space Station. After Zvezda, there was a hiatus in reusable projects until Buran.

The Buran orbital vehicle programme was developed in response to the U.S. Space Shuttle program, which raised considerable concerns among the Soviet military and especially Defense Minister Dmitry Ustinov. An authoritative chronicler of the Soviet and later Russian space programme, the academic Boris Chertok, recounts how the programme came into being. According to Chertok, after the U.S. developed its Space Shuttle program, the Soviet military became suspicious that it could be used for military purposes, due to its enormous payload, several times that of previous U.S. launch vehicles. Officially, the Buran orbital vehicle was designed for the delivery to orbit and return to Earth of spacecraft, cosmonauts, and supplies. Both Chertok and Gleb Lozino-Lozinskiy (General Designer and General Director of NPO Molniya) suggest that from the beginning, the programme was military in nature; however, the exact military capabilities, or intended capabilities, of the Buran programme remain classified. 

Like its American counterpart, the Buran orbital vehicle, when in transit from its landing sites back to the launch complex, was transported on the back of a large jet aeroplane – the Antonov An-225 Mriya transport aircraft, which was designed in part for this task and was the largest aircraft in the world to fly multiple times. Before the Mriya was ready (after the Buran had flown), the Myasishchev VM-T Atlant, a variant on the Soviet Myasishchev M-4 Molot (Hammer) bomber (NATO code: Bison), fulfilled the same role.

History of the Buran programme

Programme development 
The development of the Buran began in the early 1970s as a response to the U.S. Space Shuttle program. Soviet officials were concerned about a perceived military threat posed by the U.S. Space Shuttle. In their opinion, the Shuttle's 30-ton payload-to-orbit capacity and, more significantly, its 15-ton payload return capacity, were a clear indication that one of its main objectives would be to place massive experimental laser weapons into orbit that could destroy enemy missiles from a distance of several thousands of kilometres. Their reasoning was that such weapons could only be effectively tested in actual space conditions and that to cut their development time and save costs it would be necessary to regularly bring them back to Earth for modifications and fine-tuning. Soviet officials were also concerned that the U.S. Space Shuttle could make a sudden dive into the atmosphere to drop nuclear bombs on Moscow.

In 1974, Valentin Glushko's design bureau, OKB-1 (later NPO Energiya), proposed a new family of heavy-lift rockets called RLA. The RLA concept included the use of kerosene and liquid hydrogen as fuel, and liquid oxygen as oxidizer (both new technologies in the Soviet space programme), with the shuttle orbiter being one possible payload. While NPO Molniya conducted development under the lead of Gleb Lozino-Lozinskiy, the Soviet Union's Military-Industrial Commission, or VPK, was tasked with collecting all data it could on the U.S. Space Shuttle. Under the auspices of the KGB, the VPK was able to amass documentation on the American shuttle's airframe designs, design analysis software, materials, flight computer systems and propulsion systems. The KGB targeted many university research project documents and databases, including Caltech, MIT, Princeton, Stanford and others. The thoroughness of the acquisition of data was made much easier as the U.S. shuttle development was unclassified. 

By 1975, NPO Energiya had come up with two competing designs for the orbiter vehicle: the MTKVP, a 34 meter-long lifting body spaceplane launched on top of a stack of kerosene-fueled strap on boosters; and the OS-120, a close copy of the US Space Shuttle based on US Space Shuttle documentation and designs obtained through the VPK and KGB. The OS-120 was a delta-winged spaceplane based heavily on the US Space Shuttle design, equipped with three liquid hydrogen engines, strapped to a detachable external tank and four liquid fuel boosters (NPO Energiya even considered the use of solid propellant rocket boosters, further imitating the US Shuttle's configuration). 

A compromise between these two proposals was achieved by NPO Energiya in January 1976 with the OK-92, a delta-winged orbiter equipped with two Soloviev D-30 turbofan jet engines for autonomous atmospheric flight, launched to space from a rocket stack made of a core stage with three cryogenic engines, and four kerosene-fueled boosters, each with four engines. By 1978, the OK-92 design was further refined, with its final configuration completed in June 1979.

Soviet engineers were initially reluctant to implement a spacecraft design with so many similarities to the US Space Shuttle. Although it has been commented that wind tunnel testing showed that NASA's design was already ideal, the shape requirements were mandated by its potential military capabilities to transport large payloads to low Earth orbit, themselves a counterpart to the Pentagon's initially projected missions for the Shuttle. Even though the Molniya Scientific Production Association proposed its Spiral programme design (halted 13 years earlier), it was rejected as being altogether dissimilar from the American shuttle design. 

The construction of the shuttles began in 1980, and by 1984 the first full-scale Buran was rolled out. The first suborbital test flight of a scale-model (BOR-5) took place as early as July 1983. As the project progressed, five additional scale-model flights were performed. A test vehicle was constructed with four jet engines mounted at the rear; this vehicle is usually referred to as OK-GLI, or as the "Buran aerodynamic analogue". The jets were used to take off from a normal landing strip, and once it reached a designated point, the engines were cut and OK-GLI glided back to land. This provided invaluable information about the handling characteristics of the Buran design, and significantly differed from the carrier plane/air drop method used by the United States and the test craft. Twenty-four test flights of OK-GLI were performed by the Gromov Flight Research Institute test pilots and researchers after which the shuttle was "worn out". The developers considered using a couple of Mil Mi-26 helicopters to "bundle" lift the Buran, but test flights with a mock-up showed how risky and impractical that was. The VM-T ferried components and the Antonov An-225 Mriya (the heaviest airplane ever) was designed and used to ferry the shuttle.

The flight and ground-testing software also required research. In 1983 the Buran developers estimated that the software development would require several thousand programmers if done with their existing methodology (in assembly language), and they appealed to Keldysh Institute of Applied Mathematics for assistance. It was decided to develop a new high-level "problem-oriented" programming language. Researchers at Keldysh developed two languages: PROL2 (used for real-time programming of onboard systems) and DIPOL (used for the ground-based test systems), as well as the development and debugging environment SAPO PROLOGUE. There was also an operating system known as Prolog Manager. Work on these languages continued beyond the end of the Buran programme, with PROL2 being extended into SIPROL, and eventually all three languages developed into DRAKON which is still in use in the Russian space industry. A declassified May 1990 CIA report citing open-source intelligence material states that the software for the Buran spacecraft was written in "the French-developed programming language known as Prolog", possibly due to confusion with the name PROLOGUE.

Flight crew preparation 

Until the end of the Soviet Union in 1991, seven cosmonauts were allocated to the Buran programme and trained on the OK-GLI ("Buran aerodynamic analogue") test vehicle. All had experience as test pilots. They were: Ivan Ivanovich Bachurin, Alexei Sergeyevich Borodai, Anatoli Semyonovich Levchenko, Aleksandr Vladimirovich Shchukin, Rimantas Antanas Stankevičius, Igor Petrovich Volk, and Viktor Vasiliyevich Zabolotsky.

A rule, set in place for cosmonauts because of the failed Soyuz 25 of 1977, insisted that all Soviet space missions contain at least one crew member who has been to space before. In 1982, it was decided that all Buran commanders and their back-ups would occupy the third seat on a Soyuz mission, prior to their Buran spaceflight. Several people had been selected to potentially be in the first Buran crew. By 1985, it was decided that at least one of the two crew members would be a test pilot trained at the Gromov Flight Research Institute (known as "LII"), and potential crew lists were drawn up. Only two potential Buran crew members reached space: Igor Volk, who flew in Soyuz T-12 to the space station Salyut 7, and Anatoli Levchenko who visited Mir, launching with Soyuz TM-4 and landing with Soyuz TM-3. Both of these spaceflights lasted about a week.

Levchenko died of a brain tumour the year after his orbital flight, Bachurin left the cosmonaut corps because of medical reasons, Shchukin was assigned to the back-up crew of Soyuz TM-4 and later died in a plane crash, Stankevičius was also killed in a plane crash, while Borodai and Zabolotsky remained unassigned to a Soyuz flight until the Buran programme ended.

Spaceflight of I. P. Volk 

Igor Volk was planned to be the commander of the first crewed Buran flight. There were two purposes of the Soyuz T-12 mission, one of which was to give Volk spaceflight experience. The other purpose, seen as the more important factor, was to beat the United States and have the first spacewalk by a woman. At the time of the Soyuz T-12 mission the Buran programme was still a state secret. The appearance of Volk as a crew member caused some, including the British Interplanetary Society magazine Spaceflight, to ask why a test pilot was occupying a Soyuz seat usually reserved for researchers or foreign cosmonauts.

Spaceflight of A. S. Levchenko 

Anatoli Levchenko was planned to be the back-up commander of the first crewed Buran flight, and in March 1987 he began extensive training for his Soyuz spaceflight. In December 1987, he occupied the third seat aboard Soyuz TM-4 to Mir, and returned to Earth about a week later on Soyuz TM-3. His mission is sometimes called Mir LII-1, after the Gromov Flight Research Institute shorthand. When Levchenko died the following year, it left the back-up crew of the first Buran mission again without spaceflight experience. A Soyuz spaceflight for another potential back-up commander was sought by the Gromov Flight Research Institute, but never occurred.

Ground facilities 

Maintenance, launches and landings of the Buran-class orbiters were to take place at the Baikonur Cosmodrome in the Kazakh SSR. Several facilities at Baikonur were adapted or newly built for these purposes:

 Site 110 – Used for the launch of the Buran-class orbiters. Like the assembly and processing hall at Site 112, the launch complex was originally constructed for the Soviet lunar landing program and later converted for the Energia-Buran program.
 Site 112 – Used for orbiter maintenance and to mate the orbiters to their Energia launchers (thus fulfilling a role similar to the VAB at KSC). The main hangar at the site, called MIK RN or MIK 112, was originally built for the assembly of the N1 moon rocket. After cancellation of the N-1 programme in 1974, the facilities at Site 112 were converted for the Energia-Buran programme. It was here that Orbiter K1 was stored after the end of the Buran programme and was destroyed when the hangar roof collapsed in 2002.
 Site 251 – Used as Buran orbiter landing facility, also known as Yubileyniy Airfield (and fulfilling a role similar to the SLF at KSC). At the edge of the runway was a special mating-demating device, designed to lift an orbiter off its Antonov An-225 Mriya carrier aircraft and load it on a transporter, which would carry the orbiter to the processing building at Site 254. A purpose-built orbiter landing control facility, housed in a large multi-storey office building, was located near the runway. Yubileyniy Airfield was also used to receive heavy transport planes carrying elements of the Energia-Buran system. After the end of the Buran programme, Site 251 was abandoned but later reopened as a commercial cargo airport. Besides serving Baikonur, Kazakh authorities also use it for passenger and charter flights from Russia.
 Site 254 – Built to service the Buran-class orbiters between flights (thus fulfilling a role similar to the OPF at KSC). Constructed in the 1980s as a special four-bay building, it also featured a large processing area flanked by several floors of test rooms. After cancellation of the Buran programme it was adapted for pre-launch operations of the Soyuz and Progress spacecraft.

Missions 

Following a series of atmospheric test flights using the jet-powered OK-GLI prototype, the first operational spacecraft (Orbiter K1) flew one test mission on 15 November 1988 at 03:00:02 UTC. The spacecraft was launched uncrewed from and landed at Baikonur Cosmodrome in the Kazakh S.S.R. and flew two orbits, travelling  in 3 hours and 25 minutes (0.14 flight days). Buran never flew again; the programme was cancelled shortly after the dissolution of the Soviet Union. In 2002, the collapse of the hangar in which it was stored destroyed the Buran K1 orbiter.

Atmospheric test flights 

An aerodynamic testbed, OK-GLI, was constructed in 1984 to test the in-flight properties of the Buran design. Unlike the American prototype , OK-GLI had four AL-31 turbofan engines fitted, meaning it was able to fly under its own power.

Orbital flight of Buran 1.01 in 1988 

The only orbital launch of Buran (orbiter 1K) was at 03:00 UTC on 15 November 1988 from pad 110/37 in Baikonur. The uncrewed craft was lifted into orbit by the specially designed Energia booster rocket. The life support system was not installed and no software was installed on the CRT displays. The shuttle orbited the Earth twice in 206 minutes of flight. On its return, it performed an automated landing on the shuttle runway at Baikonur Cosmodrome.

Planned flights 
The planned flights for the shuttles in 1989, before the downsizing of the project and eventual cancellation, were:
 1991 — Ptichka 1.02 uncrewed first flight, duration 1–2 days.
 1992 — Ptichka 1.02 uncrewed second flight, duration 7–8 days. Orbital manoeuvres and space station approach test.
 1993 — Buran 1.01 uncrewed second flight, duration 15–20 days.
 1994 — Orbiter 2.01 first crewed space test flight, duration of 24 hours. Craft equipped with life-support system and with two ejection seats. Crew would consist of two cosmonauts with Igor Volk as commander, and Aleksandr Ivanchenko as flight engineer.
 1994-1995 - Second, third, fourth and fifth crewed orbital test flights.

The planned uncrewed second flight of Ptichka was changed in 1991 to the following:
 December 1991 — Ptichka 1.02 uncrewed second flight, with a duration of 7–8 days. Orbital manoeuvrers and space station approach test: 
 automatic docking with Mir's Kristall module
 crew transfer from Mir to the shuttle, with testing of some of its systems in the course of twenty-four hours, including the remote manipulator
 undocking and autonomous flight in orbit
 docking of the crewed Soyuz TM-101 with Ptichka
 crew transfer from the Soyuz to the shuttle and onboard work in the course of twenty-four hours
 automatic undocking and landing

Cancellation of the programme 1993 

After the first flight of a Buran shuttle, the project was suspended due to lack of funds and the political situation in the Soviet Union. The two subsequent orbiters, which were due in 1990 (Orbiter 1.02) and 1992 (Orbiter 2.01) were never completed. The project was officially terminated on 30 June 1993, by President Boris Yeltsin. At the time of its cancellation, 20 billion roubles had been spent on the Buran programme.

The programme was designed to boost national pride, carry out research, and meet technological objectives similar to those of the U.S. Space Shuttle program, including resupply of the Mir space station, which was launched in 1986 and remained in service until 2001. When Mir was finally visited by a spaceplane, the visitor was a Space Shuttle orbiter, not a Buran-class orbiter. 

The Buran SO, a docking module that was to be used for rendezvous with the Mir space station, was refitted for use with the U.S. Space Shuttles during the Shuttle–Mir missions.

The cost of a Buran launch carrying a 20 ton payload was estimated at 270 million roubles, vs 5.5 million roubles on the Proton rocket.

Baikonur hangar collapse 
On 12 May 2002, a hangar roof at the Baikonur Cosmodrome in Kazakhstan collapsed because of a structural failure due to poor maintenance. The collapse killed eight workers and destroyed one of the Buran-class orbiters (Buran 1.01), which flew the test flight in 1988, as well as a mock-up of an Energia booster rocket. It was not clear to outsiders at the time which Buran-class orbiter was destroyed, and the BBC reported that it was just "a model" of the orbiter. It occurred at the MIK RN/MIK 112 building at Site 112 of the Baikonur Cosmodrome, 14 years after the only Buran flight. Work on the roof had begun for a maintenance project, whose equipment is thought to have contributed to the collapse. Also, before the day of collapse, there had been several days of heavy rain.

Revival possibilities 

Over time, several scientists looked into trying to revive the Buran programme, especially after the Space Shuttle Columbia disaster.

The 2003 grounding of the U.S. Space Shuttles caused many to wonder whether the Energia launcher or Buran shuttle could be brought back into service. By then, however, all of the equipment for both (including the vehicles themselves) had fallen into disrepair or been repurposed after falling into disuse with the collapse of the Soviet Union.

In 2010 the director of Moscow's Central Machine Building Institute said the Buran programme would be reviewed in the hope of restarting a similar crewed spacecraft design, with rocket test launches as soon as 2015. Russia also continues work on the PPTS but has abandoned the Kliper program, due to differences in vision with its European partners.

Due to the 2011 retirement of the American Space Shuttle and the need for STS-type craft in the meantime to complete the International Space Station, some American and Russian scientists had been mulling over plans to possibly revive the already-existing Buran shuttles in the Buran programme rather than spend money on an entirely new craft and wait for it to be fully developed but the plans did not come to fruition.

On the 25th anniversary of the Buran flight in November 2013, Oleg Ostapenko, the new head of Roscosmos, the Russian Federal Space Agency, proposed that a new heavy-lift launch vehicle be built for the Russian space programme.

Vehicles

Energia launch vehicle

Buran orbiter

Antonov An-225 Mriya

Energia liquid rocket booster

Energia-Buran and the US Space Shuttle

Comparison to NASA's Space Shuttle 
Despite remarkable external similarities, many key differences existed, which suggests that, had espionage been a factor in Buran development, it would likely have been in the form of external photography or early airframe designs. NASA Administrator James C. Fletcher stated that Buran was based on a rejected NASA design. See the  section above.

Key differences between Energia-Buran system and NASA's Space Shuttle 
 Unlike Space Shuttle's boosters, each of Energia's four boosters had their own guidance, navigation, and control system. Known as Zenit-2, they were used as launch vehicles on their own to deliver smaller payloads than those requiring the complete Energia-Buran system.
 Energia could be configured with four, two or no boosters for payloads other than Buran, and in full configuration was able to put up to 100 metric tons into orbit. The Space Shuttle orbiter was integral to its launch system and was the system's only payload.
 Energia's four boosters used liquid propellant (kerosene/oxygen). The Space Shuttle's two boosters used solid propellant.
 The liquid fueled booster rockets were not constructed in segments vulnerable to leakage through O-rings, which caused the destruction of.
 Energia's four boosters were designed to be recovered after each flight, though they were not recovered during Energia's two operational flights. The Space Shuttle's boosters were recovered and reused.
Buran equivalent of the Space Shuttle Orbital Maneuvering System used GOX/LOX/Kerosene propellant, with lower toxicity and higher performance (a specific impulse of  using a turbopump system) than the Shuttle's pressure-fed monomethylhydrazine/dinitrogen tetroxide OMS engines.
Buran was designed to be capable of both piloted and fully autonomous flight, including landing. The Space Shuttle was later retrofitted with automated landing capability, first flown 18 years after the Buran on STS-121, but the system was intended to be used only in contingencies.
 The nose landing gear was located much farther back on the fuselage rather than just under the mid-deck as with the NASA Space Shuttle.
Buran could lift 30 metric tons into orbit in its standard configuration, comparable to the early Space Shuttle's original 27.8 metric tons
Buran could return 20 tons from orbit, vs the Space Shuttle's 15 tons.
Buran included a drag chute, the Space Shuttle originally did not, but was later retrofitted to include one.
 The lift-to-drag ratio of Buran is cited as 5.6, compared to a subsonic L/D of 4.5 for the Space Shuttle.
Buran and Energia were moved to the launch pad horizontally on a rail transporter, and then erected and fueled at the launch site. The Space Shuttle was transported vertically on the crawler-transporter with loaded solid boosters but the main tank was fueled at launch site.
Buran was intended to carry a crew of up to ten, the Shuttle carried up to eight in the largest crewed mission normally between five and seven people in most missions and would have carried more only in a contingency.
Buran has a different carbon-carbon heat tile layout in its underside, in which all gaps between heat tiles are parallel or perpendicular to the direction of airflow through the orbiter.

See also 

 MAKS (spacecraft) - Soviet air-launched spaceplane concept
 Mikoyan-Gurevich MiG-105 – Soviet spaceplane test programme
 Space Shuttle program - American spaceplane
 Tupolev OOS - Soviet air-launched spaceplane concept

References

Bibliography

External links 

 Buran.ru, official website by NPO Molniya
 Buran.ru unofficial space encyclopedia (ru)
 Buran at Encyclopedia Astronautica
 Buran and Energia at Buran-Energia.com
 Buran at RussianSpaceWeb.com
 Buran: The Soviet Space Shuttle Success Story at TASS 

 
1974 establishments in the Soviet Union
1993 disestablishments in Russia
Crewed spacecraft
Myasishchev aircraft
Partially reusable space launch vehicles
Rocket-powered aircraft
Spaceplanes